Capoeta coadi is a cyprinid fish endemic to the Karun River drainage in Iran.

References 

coadi
Fish described in 2016